The Church of St Edmund is a Church of England parish church in Sedgefield, County Durham. The church is a grade I listed building and dates from the 13th century.

History
The parish of Sedgefield was created by Cutheard of Lindisfarne during his time as Bishop of Lindisfarne (between 900 and 915). The first church was likely made of wood and this was replaced with a stone church by the Normans.

From 1246 to 1256, the current church was built. The church is dedicated to Edmund of Abingdon, a former Archbishop of Canterbury who died in 1240 (shortly before the church was built). There have been a number of additions to the building: in c.1290 transepts and a chancel were added; c.1490 a tower was added; in the 19th century a porch was added; and a vestry and organ chamber were added in 1913.

On 9 January 1968, the church was designated a grade I listed building.

Present day
Today, the Church of St Edmund is part of the Benefice of Upper Skerne in the Archdeaconry of Durham of the Diocese of Durham. The church stands in the Central tradition of the Church of England.

Notable clergy

 George Howe, later Archdeacon of Westmorland and Furness, served as Rector of the parish from 1985 to 1991

References

External links
 Parish website
 A Church Near You entry

Church of England church buildings in County Durham
Grade I listed churches in County Durham
13th-century church buildings in England
Saint Edmund